Ramiro Costa (born 21 August 1992), is an Argentine footballer who plays as a striker for Montevideo Wanderers.

Club career
He reached the bottom of Rosario Central in 2008 from San Jose club. He made his first professional season with the squad in the summer of 2011 and debuted at the Central team February 11, 2011 at Almirante Brown in the trainer's hand Hector Rivoira.1 In the following date started against San Martín de San Juan but failed to have continuity in the remainder of the season as he suffered an injury to his right ankle.

With the arrival of Juan Antonio Pizzi as coach for the season 2011/12 added minutes in the first games of the tournament but with the passing of the parties lost their place in the squad.

In July signs for Universidad Católica in a 3 years contract. On 13 December he scores his first professional goal in a draw against deportes iquique.

Honours
Atlante
Liga de Expansión MX: Apertura 2021

External links

1992 births
Living people
Argentine footballers
Argentine expatriate footballers
Association football forwards
Footballers from Rosario, Santa Fe
Rosario Central footballers
Club Deportivo Universidad Católica footballers
Unión La Calera footballers
ASA 2013 Târgu Mureș players
Atlético de Rafaela footballers
Club Atlético Temperley footballers
San Martín de Tucumán footballers
Atlante F.C. footballers
Montevideo Wanderers F.C. players
Argentine Primera División players
Primera Nacional players
Chilean Primera División players
Liga I players
Uruguayan Primera División players
Argentine expatriate sportspeople in Chile
Argentine expatriate sportspeople in Romania
Argentine expatriate sportspeople in Mexico
Argentine expatriate sportspeople in Uruguay
Expatriate footballers in Chile
Expatriate footballers in Romania
Expatriate footballers in Mexico
Expatriate footballers in Uruguay